The 2020 Navy Midshipmen football team represented the United States Naval Academy in the 2020 NCAA Division I FBS football season. The Midshipmen were led by thirteenth-year head coach Ken Niumatalolo and played their home games at Navy–Marine Corps Memorial Stadium. Navy competed as a member of the American Athletic Conference (AAC).

Previous season
The Midshipmen finished the 2019 season 11–2, 7–1 in AAC play to finish in a tie for first place in the West Division, losing the tiebreaker to Memphis. The Midshipmen were invited to the Liberty Bowl, where they defeated Kansas State.

Preseason

Award watch lists
Listed in the order that they were released

AAC preseason media poll
The preseason poll was released on September 1, 2020. The Midshipmen were predicted to finish in fifth place in the conference.

Schedule
Navy had games scheduled against Lafayette and Notre Dame which were canceled due to the COVID-19 pandemic. The game against Notre Dame was originally scheduled to be played at Aviva Stadium in Dublin as the Emerald Isle Classic, but was rescheduled and moved back to the United States due to concerns regarding the COVID-19 pandemic. It was later canceled entirely when the Fighting Irish, playing as part of the ACC for the first time, chose Western Michigan as their one non-conference opponent for the season (which was itself canceled when the MAC canceled fall sports). The South Florida game, originally scheduled for November 21, was declared a no-contest following Covid issues with the Bulls' team.

Personnel

Coaching staff

Source:

Roster

The Navy football roster for the Week 1 game versus BYU (as of September 7, 2020):

Game summaries

BYU

at Tulane

at Air Force

Temple

With this victory, Navy Coach Ken Niumatalolo achieved his 100th win, becoming the 6th active head coach at the FBS level to win 100 games at one school.

at East Carolina

Houston

at SMU

Memphis

Tulsa

at Army

References

Navy
Navy Midshipmen football seasons
Navy Midshipmen football